Jerome "Jay" Apt III, Ph.D. (born April 28, 1949 in Massachusetts) is an American astronaut and professor at Carnegie Mellon University. Before becoming an astronaut, Apt was a physicist who worked on the Pioneer Venus 1978 space probe project, and used visible light and infrared techniques to study the planets and moons of the solar system from ground-based observatories.

Biography

Apt was a resident of  Shadyside and graduated from Shady Side Academy in Pittsburgh, Pennsylvania in 1967. He went on to attend Harvard University, earning a Bachelor of Arts in physics in 1971. He then attended the Massachusetts Institute of Technology and earned a Doctor of Philosophy in physics in 1976. From 1976 to 1980 he was a staff member of the Center for Earth & Planetary Physics at Harvard, and served as the Assistant Director of Harvard's Division of Applied Sciences from 1978 to 1980. In 1980 he joined the Earth and Space Sciences Division of the NASA Jet Propulsion Laboratory (JPL) as a scientist doing planetary research; he was science manager of the optical facilities at JPL's Table Mountain Observatory. From 1982 through 1985 he was a flight controller responsible for Shuttle payload operations at NASA's Johnson Space Center. He worked in the mission control center on missions STS-7, STS-8, STS-41B, STS-41C, STS-41D, STS-41G, STS-51A, and STS-51D (the last four as Payload Officer). In 1985 he was selected as an astronaut candidate, and qualified to become an astronaut after a year of training. He has over 6,000 hours piloting aircraft, has flown on four space missions and has logged over 847 hours in space.

In 1991, Apt flew on the STS-37 mission aboard shuttle Atlantis. He made two spacewalks with Jerry Ross, manually deploying the Compton Gamma Ray Observatory's radio antenna when it failed to do so automatically; on the next day their second spacewalk tested hardware later used on the International Space Station. During the second Extra Vehicular Activity the palm-bar in Apt's right glove punctured the suit. Apt's hand conformed to the puncture, filling the hole before any noticeable depressurization could occur. Apt was unaware of the puncture until the glove was examined after the mission. Despite being partially exposed to vacuum he sustained only a minor scar. In 1992, Apt flew on STS-47 aboard shuttle Endeavour as the flight engineer, and commander of one of the two shifts in this round-the-clock mission. In 1994, Apt was again a shift commander of the first Space Radar Laboratory mission, STS-59 aboard shuttle Endeavour. This lab studied the Earth. In 1996, Apt flew on STS-79 aboard shuttle Atlantis and visited the Russian Mir space station.

In 2003, Apt joined the faculty of Carnegie Mellon University where he is a Full Professor (emeritus) at the Tepper School of Business and the Department of Engineering and Public Policy. His research and teaching interests are in economics, engineering, and public policy aspects of the electricity industry, economics of technical innovation, management of technical enterprises, risk management in policy and technical decision framing, and engineering systems design. From 2000 through 2022 he and faculty member Granger Morgan directed the Carnegie Mellon Electricity Industry Center.

He is the author of the book Orbit: NASA Astronauts Photograph the Earth, published by the National Geographic Society. The book has been printed in eleven languages; more than 600,000 copies have been sold. His book Variable Renewable Energy and the Electricity Grid was published in 2014. He is the author of a large number of technical scientific publications. He received the NASA Distinguished Service Medal in 1997 and the Metcalf Lifetime Achievement Award for significant contributions to engineering in 2002. His paper with PhD student Adam Newcomer, "Near term implications of a ban on new coal-fired power plants in the US" was cited as one of the top environmental policy papers of 2009 by the American Chemical Society. In 2012, the International Astronomical Union approved the name "Jeromeapt" for the main-belt asteroid 116903, as suggested by its discoverer, James Young. Apt is a Fellow of the American Association for the Advancement of Science.

Personal life
Apt has two children.

References

External links

Tepper School of Business Faculty Homepage
Spacefacts biography of Jerome Apt
Jay Apt's Website Orbit Experience
Astronaut biography on NASA site
Jay Apt's "Journey" Lecture at Carnegie Mellon University

1949 births
Living people
Jewish American scientists
Harvard College alumni
Carnegie Mellon University faculty
Scientists from Pittsburgh
NASA civilian astronauts
Shady Side Academy alumni
Space Shuttle program astronauts
MIT Department of Physics alumni
Spacewalkers
Mir crew members